Trinidad and Tobago competed at the 2017 World Aquatics Championships in Budapest, Hungary from 14 July to 30 July.

Swimming

Swimmers from Trinidad and Tobago have achieved qualifying standards in the following events (up to a maximum of 2 swimmers in each event at the A-standard entry time, and 1 at the B-standard):

References

Nations at the 2017 World Aquatics Championships
Trinidad and Tobago at the World Aquatics Championships
2017 in Trinidad and Tobago sport